Debub Police Sport Club (Amharic:ደቡብ ፖሊስ ስፖርት ክለብ) is an Ethiopian football club based in Hawassa. They play in the Ethiopian Higher League, the second division of Ethiopian football.

History 
Debub Police S.C. was founded in 1996 (1989 E.C.) in Hawassa, Ethiopia. Debub Police was first promoted to the Ethiopian Premier League in the 2006–07 season.

Notable the Ethiopian striker Getaneh Kebede started his career at Debub Police.

Debub Police secured promotion to the Ethiopian Premier League on August 27, 2018 after a 3–0 win over the Dire Dawa Police. In September 2018 the club announced it had signed Zelalem Shiferaw as its new manager after parting ways with former manager Girma Tadesse.

Grounds 
Debub Police play their home games at Hawassa Stadium in the city of Hawassa in the Sidama Region of Ethiopia. Notably the playing surface at Hawassa Stadium is artificial turf.

Former Managers 

  Girma Tadesse
 Zelalem Shiferaw

Players

Current squad

References 

Football clubs in Ethiopia
Police association football clubs in Ethiopia
Sidama Region